Constantin Dragoș Albu (born 15 March 2001) is a Romanian professional footballer who plays as a midfielder for Liga I club FC U Craiova.

He started out as a senior at Jong FC Utrecht in the Netherlands, before returning to his country with FC U Craiova in 2020.

Club career
Albu made his senior debut for Jong FC Utrecht on 23 December 2017, coming on as a 79th-minute substitute for Shayne Pattynama in a 1–3 Eerste Divisie loss to Fortuna Sittard.

In the summer of 2020, he returned to Romania by signing with FC U Craiova.

Career statistics

Club

Honours
FC U Craiova
Liga II: 2020–21

References

External links

2001 births
People from Dolj County
Living people
Romanian footballers
Romania youth international footballers
Romania under-21 international footballers
Association football midfielders
Jong FC Utrecht players
Eerste Divisie players
Liga I players
Liga II players
FC U Craiova 1948 players
Expatriate footballers in the Netherlands
Romanian expatriate sportspeople in the Netherlands